Stavrochori (Greek meaning cross town) may refer to several villages in Greece:

Stavrochori, Kilkis, a village in the Kilkis regional unit
Stavrochori, Lasithi, a village in Lasithi 
Stavrochori, Preveza, a village in the Preveza regional unit